Bothriurus coriaceus (Chilean scorpion) is a species of scorpion native to Chile in the Coquimbo region specifically in the northern dunes. They are not communal and are rumored to dislike the heat and will burrow deep into the ground to get cool. 20 °C - 68 °F is said to be their preferred temperature, a much cooler  temperature than most scorpion species, and have actually been known to die in higher temperatures. In addition to living in lower temperatures they also prefer lower humidity than most species of scorpion.

References

Bothriuridae
Scorpions of South America
Animals described in 1893
Endemic fauna of Chile